Persatuan Sepakbola Nene Mallomo (simply known as PS Nene Mallomo) is an Indonesian football club based in Sidenreng Rappang Regency, South Sulawesi. They currently compete in the Liga 3.

Honours
 Liga 3 South Sulawesi
 Champion: 2017
 Third-place: 2019

References

External links

Sport in South Sulawesi
Football clubs in Indonesia
Football clubs in South Sulawesi
Association football clubs established in 2019
2019 establishments in Indonesia